The 2008 Battle of Mogadishu began when Ethiopian soldiers started entering insurgent-held parts of the city which sparked heavy street fighting. Between 126 and 142 people died in the fighting.  The battle usually includes the date, when referenced, in order to distinguish it amongst the nine major Battles of Mogadishu during the decades long Somali Civil War.

Timeline 
On April 19, militants ambushed a group of Ethiopian soldiers, who entered an area of Mogadishu on foot, sparking heavy battles. The intense battle spread out across three districts in the northern quarter of the capital Mogadishu, with Ethiopian troops expanding into insurgent strongholds for the first time in weeks. Abdi Rahim Isa Adow, a spokesman for the Islamic insurgents, confirmed that seven militants had been killed but said that "a large number of Ethiopian soldiers" had also been killed. Witness Omar Abdulahi said that among the dead he counted were two old men shot by Ethiopian soldiers inside their homes. Nasteho Moalim said her 7-year-old daughter and three neighbors were killed by tank shells fired by Ethiopian forces that hit their homes.

On April 20, Islamist insurgents ambushed a security vehicle in the capital's Madina neighbourhood, killing two soldiers and a shopowner who was caught in the crossfire. Later in the day, five Somali soldiers and three insurgents in addition to a number of civilians. Two Ethiopian soldiers were confirmed to be among the dead.

On April 21, the Somali capital was largely quiet as residents ventured out onto the streets to collect the bodies of the dead or escape the city.

Hidaya Mosque massacre 

According to several witnesses, Ethiopian soldiers stormed a mosque and killed several occupants. 11 bodies were later found, some with their throat slit and others shot to death. Of the 11 dead victims, nine were regular congregants at the mosque and reportedly were part of the Tabliiq wing of Sunni Islam.

Tabliiq official Shiekh Abdi-kheyr Isse said the Ethiopians had "slaughtered" the clerics. "The first person they [Ethiopian soldiers] killed was Sheikh Said Yahya, the Imam," a witness said, adding that the late Imam opened the mosque door after the soldiers knocked.

Casualties 
98 civilians died in the fighting. Most of the casualties were caused by Ethiopians using heavy artillery and tank shells in residential areas of the war-torn capital, according to the Elman Human Rights Group.

A spokesman for the Islamic Courts Union, Sheikh Ibrahim Suley, said the real death toll from the violence was much higher. "The Ethiopians killed around 200 people and kidnapped 160 others including 41 Koranic students...We will continue fighting the Ethiopians and those under the protection of their tanks. We call on them to repent," Suley told Reuters.

See also
Somali Civil War
Battle of Mogadishu (1993)
Battle of Mogadishu (2006)
Fall of Mogadishu (2006)
Battle of Mogadishu (March–April 2007)
Battle of Mogadishu (November 2007)
Battle of South Mogadishu (2009)
Battle of Mogadishu (2009)
Battle of Mogadishu (2010–11)

References 

2008 in Ethiopia
2008 in Somalia
21st century in Mogadishu
Mogadishu 2008
April 2008 events in Africa